Matthew Rhys Sargent (born 24 July 2001) is a Welsh footballer who plays as a midfielder for  club Salford City.

A product of the Wrexham academy, he made his first team debut in 2018, and the following season spent time on loan at Cymru Premier team Airbus. Following his release by Wrexham in 2020, he joined Salford City. During his time at Salford, he has been loaned out to non-league clubs Widnes, Matlock Town, Ashton United and Chester. Internationally, Sargent has represented Wales at youth level, making a total of three appearances in 2017 for the U16 and U17 sides.

Career

Club career
Born in Bodelwyddan, Wales, Sargent is a product of the Wrexham academy, having joined aged 11 from Accrington Stanley. His first appearance at youth level came in October 2016 in the Football League Youth Alliance, and he scored his first goal in January 2018. Sargent made his Wrexham senior debut on 15 December of the same year, coming on as a late substitute in the 3–0 first round win in the FA Trophy against Boston United. His league debut came on the final day of the 2018–19 National League regular season, starting in a 2–1 win against Harrogate Town at the age of 17. Wrexham manager Bryan Hughes praised Sargent for his performance, describing it as "magnificent" and that he "didn't look out of place".

On 9 May, he signed his first professional contract, a one-year deal following the completion of his scholarship, and said Hughes' faith gave him confidence to progress. During pre-season of the 2019–20 season, Sargent was told by Hughes he had every chance of making it as a Wrexham first-team player, but in August was loaned out to Cymru Premier team Airbus until January. On 18 September, he received a red card for a bad tackle during a defeat to Barry Town United, and subsequently missed three games. Sargent returned to Wrexham when his loan deal ended in January 2020, and was released at the end of his contract in June.

He signed for EFL League Two team Salford City in October of their 2020–21 season, and moved on loan to Widnes of the Northern Premier League Division One West in the same month, making his debut on 24 October as a substitute in a 1–1 with Trafford. His first goal for the club came a week later, scoring the only goal of the game against Mossley at the DCBL Stadium, described by The Non-League Paper as a "thunderbolt". Upon returning to Salford, he made his debut on 8 December in the EFL Trophy second round fixture against the Leicester City Under-21 team, in which Salford were eliminated from the competition on penalties following a 3–3 draw. On 8 October 2021, having made two further appearances in the EFL Trophy during the 2021–22 season, he was loaned out to Matlock Town of the Northern Premier League. Sargent made his debut for The Gladiators the following day, starting the game against Atherton Collieries in midfield until being substituted in the 54th minute of an eventual 2–1 defeat.

In January 2022 he joined Ashton United on loan.  He followed this up with another loan spell, joining Chester in mid-March. He scored on his debut for the club, just 87 seconds into his first game as the club beat Kettering Town 4–0 on 19 March.

In October 2022 he joined Buxton on loan

International career
Internationally, Sargent has represented Wales at youth level for the U16 and U17 teams, both during 2017. He made his first and only appearance for the U16's on 30 April, starting in a 1–1 draw with San Marino. In September, Sargent was called up for the Wales U17 double-header in Llanelli against Scotland, and started the first of the two games, a 2–0 defeat. The following month, he was called up for the 2018 UEFA European Under-17 Championship qualification matches against Hungary, Kosovo, and Netherlands, starting the match against Kosovo.

Career statistics

References

External links

2001 births
Living people
Airbus UK Broughton F.C. players
Ashton United F.C. players
Chester F.C. players
Matlock Town F.C. players
Salford City F.C. players
Widnes F.C. players
Wrexham A.F.C. players
Association football midfielders
National League (English football) players
Welsh footballers
Wales youth international footballers